Holderness Academy (formerly known as South Holderness Technology College) is a coeducational secondary school and sixth form located in the East Riding of Yorkshire, England. It had previously received extra funding due to its high curricular activity in technology, I.C.T. and science, for which it had been awarded, but no longer has, Technology College status. 

Previously a community school administered by East Riding of Yorkshire Council, in October 2018 South Holderness Technology College converted to academy status and was renamed Holderness Academy. The school is now sponsored by The Consortium Academy Trust.

History

The origins of the school date back to the middle years of the Second World War and the Beveridge Report. In 1942 the University of Oxford academic William Beveridge was asked to prepare a paper for the government outlining the problems that existed within British society. His report became the basis of the Housing Act and slum clearance, the National Health Service and most importantly the 1944 Education Act. South Holderness School came into existence as a direct result of the 1944 Act.

It was recognised that there was a need for a secondary school in the South Holderness area. Children were generally educated until 14 years in a senior department of their village school. From there they entered the world of work as apprentices, farm workers, shop and office workers and so on. The 1944 Act stated that all children should remain at school until they were 15 and that after 11 years old they should be divided up according to ability.

This resulted in a so-called Tri-partite System, where children had to take an examination called the 11-plus. According to how pupils performed in the examination they were offered a place at a Grammar school, a Technical school or a Secondary Modern school. The East Riding of Yorkshire Council provided grammar school places at Beverley Grammar School, Beverley High School and Bridlington School. A grammar school form was also provided at Withernsea High School.

To implement the 1944 Act the East Riding of Yorkshire was divided up into catchment areas. A school was provided at the most convenient place within that area. In the case of South Holderness it was decided to place the school midway between Preston and Hedon. The catchment area was to include Aldbrough, Bilton, Burstwick, Coniston, Hedon, Paull, Preston, Sproatley, Sunk Island and Thorngumbald. The area to the north of South Holderness Technology College was served by Hornsea and to the east by Withernsea HS. Only children within the catchment area of a particular school were meant to attend that school.

South Holderness school was designated a Secondary Modern school. The East Riding of Yorkshire Council did not provide Secondary Technical schools in the way that Hull City Council did with Riley High school or Greatfield High school.

Site

The council decided to provide a new secondary school in the South Holderness area. The town of Hedon is very small in terms of area and so another location had to be found. Land between the village of Preston and Hedon was identified and plans were drawn up. The school had a total area of 26 acres (10.5 hectares).

A local landowner, Colonel Robinson, objected to plans to build the school on his arable land. The result was that the Ministry of Education along with the Council applied for a compulsory purchase order. This was granted after objections. The architects were appointed (Johnson and Johnson of Doncaster) and the designing of the school began.

Many East Riding schools have the same trademark brick work, floor surfaces and galvanised steel windows. Their structure and internal design features are very similar. South Hunsley, Beverley Longcroft, Withernsea, Headlands and Hornsea Schools all bear a great similarity, hardly surprising when one considers that they were being built at roughly the same time.

Original staff
Six months before the schools were ready for opening East Riding of Yorkshire Council appointed heads, each of whom incorporated their ideas into the school building at an early stage. The person appointed to lead South Holderness school was Stuart Frith a graduate teacher of chemistry and ex-British Army Major. Frith was to lead the school from 1953 to 1974. He stated that he wanted a minimum of plastered, and therefore painted surfaces, and the provision of quarry tile floors along corridors and in the Entrance Hall. There were to be bare brick walls and hardwearing floor surfaces.

Sixth Form
South Holderness Sixth Form is a Sixth Form College which is located in Preston, East Riding of Yorkshire England, with an enrolment of 230 students. In the year academic year of 2009–10 the Sixth Form had a 99% pass rate at A Level with over 90% of its students progressing directly onto university. Students study for AS and A levels, and BTEC, or re-sit their GCSE to improve their grades. Students attending the Sixth Form begin study at A Level in General Studies.

In 2009 there was a surge of students from year 11 staying on at East Riding of Yorkshire Sixth Forms, including South Holderness to continue their A Levels.

References

External links
Holderness Academy official website

Educational institutions established in 1954
Secondary schools in the East Riding of Yorkshire
1954 establishments in England
Academies in the East Riding of Yorkshire
Holderness